Gary D. Bass is the executive director of the Bauman Foundation, and founder and former executive director of OMB Watch.

Bass received a combined doctorate in psychology and education from the University of Michigan. He was president of the Human Services Information Center before founding OMB Watch in 1983. Since then he has been a prominent commentator on federal information policy issues and assisted other nonprofit organizations: The NonProfit Times listed him within their Power and Influence Top 50. In 1989, he created RTK NET (the Right-to-Know Network), a free online service to provide community groups with access to government data.

External links
 OMB Watch profile of Gary Bass
 

Year of birth missing (living people)
Living people
University of Michigan alumni